Rail sabotage is one of the Belarusian forms of grassroots action opposing the 2022 Russian invasion of Ukraine.

At the end of February 2022, the first reports appeared in the media about sabotage on Belarusian railways in order to disable manpower, signalling control equipment, and the transport of military materiel by rail for military operations on the territory of Ukraine.

Actions

Signalling equipment was destroyed in three regions of Belarus, and railway lines were blocked. As a result of these operations, the work of several branches of the Belarusian railway was disrupted, particularly in the south of Belarus. There have been some 80 acts of sabotage on Belarusian railways as of 12 April, based on data from the Belarusian Interior Ministry. The most common form of damage is setting fire to the signalling equipment. A married couple set fire to the logs of military equipment kept by the railways. Other acts of sabotage have involved the railway's workers themselves as well as hackers attacking the railway's computer system. The Deputy Interior Minister threatened to kill the partisans in a statement in early March. Shots were fired at people attempting to set fire to a signal box in late March. In late April, the lower house of Parliament passed a law to apply the death penalty for sabotage.

The opposition's actions assisted Ukrainian forces in defeating the Russian offensive which aimed to conquer Kyiv.

See also
 Rail war
 2022 rail war in Russia

References

External links
 Sly, Liz The Belarusian railway workers who helped thwart Russia’s attack on Kyiv The Washington Post (April 23, 2022)

Belarus in the 2022 Russian invasion of Ukraine
Protests in Belarus
Resistance movements
Opposition to Vladimir Putin
2022 in Belarus
Acts of sabotage
Rail transport in Belarus
Resistance during the 2022 Russian invasion of Ukraine
2022 crimes in Belarus
Railway accidents in 2022
Railway accidents and incidents in Belarus